Captain Frederick John Holroyd is a former British soldier who was based at the British Army's 3 Brigade HQ in mid-Ulster, Northern Ireland during the 1970s. He enlisted as a gunner in the Royal Artillery, and three years later, in 1964, he was commissioned into the Royal Army Service Corps (later the Royal Corps of Transport). He volunteered for the Special Military Intelligence Unit in Northern Ireland in 1969, and he was trained at the Joint Services School of Intelligence. Once his training was finished, he was stationed in Portadown, where, for two and a half years up to 1975, he ran a series of intelligence operations. He resigned from the Army in 1976.

Collusion allegations
Holroyd has made several claims of collusion between the Intelligence Corps and Ulster loyalist paramilitaries during the Troubles in Northern Ireland. Holroyd was one of a number of former security force members who either exposed or admitted to such activity, the most prominent being Colin Wallace and John Weir.

Holroyd also claimed that during the mid-1970s the Special Air Service (SAS) used the cover name,  "4 Field Survey Troop, Royal Engineers" during operations. This modus operandi was introduced in 1973 and abandoned in 1975. Fred Holroyd claimed this was an SAS unit working undercover at the Royal Engineers' base at Castledillon, County Armagh. Holroyd said he worked with the members of this unit and that members were told that it was a NITAT (Northern Ireland Training and Tactics Team), whose personnel were "former, serving or recently trained" Holroyd claimed that the unit was made up of SAS soldiers, with the commanders being infantry officers attached to the SAS. One of these was Captain Robert Nairac, described as, "seconded to 14th Intelligence", otherwise known as 14 Intelligence Company" or '14 Int'.

He also added to allegations that a cabal of right-wing British intelligence operatives from MI5 and the SIS, along with figures from the British establishment, had been involved in a plot to destabilise and overthrow British Prime Minister Harold Wilson through a secret organization known as "Group 13". The former intelligence officer Peter Wright, author of Spycatcher, was said to have been part of this group. Holroyd's allegations surfaced again in a New Statesman article written by Duncan Campbell in 1984. Holroyd's allegations helped form the basis for the 1990 Ken Loach film, Hidden Agenda.

Involvement with Ken Livingstone MP
Labour Member of Parliament in the UK, Ken Livingstone, formerly Head of the Greater London Council, latterly Mayor of London, took up the case of Fred Holroyd, and used his maiden speech as MP to highlight Holroyd's allegations.

Livingstone also asked a series of questions in the parliament session about Holroyd's treatment following his allegations of collusion between British Army Intelligence and loyalist paramilitaries.

Life after the military
Following the surfacing of these allegations Holroyd claims to have been forcibly retired from MI6 and placed in Netley Hospital, a military mental health institution. Holroyd has campaigned since then to have the Ministry of Defence admit that he was wrongly institutionalised. 

Holroyd wrote the book War without Honour with Nick Burbridge. It was published in 1989.

Barron report into the Dublin and Monaghan bombings
Holroyd gave evidence to Justice Henry Barron during his inquiry into the Dublin and Monaghan bombings of 17 May 1974. Holroyd stated that "the bombings were part of a pattern of collusion between elements of the security forces in Northern Ireland and loyalist paramilitaries."

Barron was asked about a seeming contradiction in Holroyd's input to the report during public hearings:

When asked at a public hearing what he meant by "compromise source", Barron replied:

There are many reports on him suggesting that he is a Walter Mitty type. That is probably the easiest way of explaining it... We said his detail was totally unreliable but the substance related to events which took place.

In his official statement to the Oireachtas joint Committee, Barron stated:

A number of Holroyd's allegations are not completely true, but they relate to events that did happen. Insofar as they raise serious questions concerning the behaviour of the security forces, North and South during the 1970s, they are of relevance to the work of this Inquiry, and have contributed to the Inquiry's view on the possibility of collusion between elements of the security forces in Northern Ireland and loyalist paramilitaries. 

Barron also stated in his Report,

It must be said that when interviewed by the Inquiry [Holroyd] made no effort to avoid any questions asked of him; nor did he appear to be withholding information. He gave his answers openly, fairly and with conviction. He is aware that he has been misquoted and misinterpreted on occasion and has sought to correct any misapprehensions where they have arisen. He has also shown a willingness to take on board evidence and information which seem to contradict his claims, though for the most part he has maintained the truth of his allegations and of their provenance.

In his report Barron found that members of the Garda Síochána (Republic of Ireland police force) and of the Royal Ulster Constabulary (RUC) attempted to unfairly and unjustly undermine the evidence and character of Holroyd. For instance

Holroyd was also proven correct in his allegation that a Garda officer arranged a meeting in Dublin between an Irish Army EOD officer and his British counterpart. The denial of the Garda officer concerned that he requested Holroyd organise the meeting should be read in the light of his attempts to deny knowing or meeting Holroyd at all, which are not convincing.

Barron also noted,

Some of the RUC officers interviewed by the Inquiry, in their apparent eagerness to deny Holroyd any credibility whatsoever, themselves made inaccurate and misleading statements which have unfortunately tarnished their own credibility.

Then Assistant Commissioner of the Garda, Edmund Garvey denied that he had met Holroyd at Garda headquarters in 1975. Holroyd named Garvey, and another Garda (codename: "the badger"), as being on the "British side". Justice Barron found: "The visit by Holroyd to Garda Headquarters unquestionably did take place, notwithstanding former Commissioner Garvey's inability to recall it". Barron further noted:

On the Northern side, there is conflicting evidence as to how, why and by whom the visit was arranged. Regrettably, Garda investigations have failed to uncover any documentary evidence of the visit, or to identify any of the officers involved in arranging it from the Southern side.

On 19 January 1978, then Commissioner Edmund Garvey was sacked without explanation by the incoming Fianna Fáil government, which stated that it no longer had "confidence" in him as Garda Commissioner.

References

External links
Holroyd input to Barron report
The SAS, their early days in Ireland and the Wilson Plot by Seán Mac Mathúna
Ken Livingstone Parliamentary question on Holroyd's status while placed in Mental Health institute
Articles on the war in Rhodesia

Place of birth missing (living people)
Year of birth missing (living people)
Living people
Royal Artillery soldiers
Royal Army Service Corps officers
Royal Corps of Transport officers
British whistleblowers